T Padmanabhan may refer to:

 Thanu Padmanabhan, Indian astrophysicist
 Thinakkal Padmanabhan, Malayalam short story writer